Aeverrillioidea is a superfamily of bryozoans belonging to the order Ctenostomatida.

References 

Bryozoans
Animal superfamilies